Richard Ostrander, known as Rick Ostrander, is an American historian and higher education leader. He serves as Vice President for Research & Scholarship at the Council for Christian Colleges and Universities.

Career
After earning a PhD in history from the University of Notre Dame under the direction of George Marsden, Ostrander taught at Taylor University in Fort Wayne, Indiana, and Grand Canyon University in Phoenix, Arizona. In 1997, Ostrander became an assistant professor of history at John Brown University. In September 2002, he became the dean of undergraduate studies at John Brown University. In 2004, he was selected as a Fulbright Scholar to teach in Germany. From 2009 to 2015, he served as provost at Cornerstone University. Ostrander became Vice President for Academic Affairs & Professional Programs at the Council for Christian Colleges and Universities (CCCU) in 2015.

Education
B.A. Moody Bible Institute (1987)
B.A. University of Michigan (1990)
M.A. University of Notre Dame (1992)
Ph.D University of Notre Dame (1996)

Publications
Author
The Life of Prayer in a World of Science: Protestants, Prayer, and American Culture, 1870-1930, New York City: Oxford University Press, 2000. .
Head, Heart, Hand: John Brown University and Evangelical Higher Education, Fayetteville, Arkansas: University of Arkansas Press, 2003. .
Why College Matters to God: An Introduction to the Christian College, Abilene, Texas: Abilene Christian University Press, 2009. .
Why College Matters to God, Revised Edition: An Introduction to the Christian College, Abilene, Texas: Abilene Christian University Press, 2012. .

Contributor
Searching for Spirituality in Higher Education, New York City: Peter Lang Publishing, 2007. .
American Evangelicalism : George Marsden and the State of American Religious History, Notre Dame, Indiana: University of Notre Dame Press, 2014. .

Personal life
Rick is married to Lonnie. They have four children.

References

University of Notre Dame alumni
University of Michigan alumni